J. W. Beatty  (in full, John William Beatty) (1869–1941) was a Canadian painter who was a forerunner in the movement which became the Group of Seven in 1920.

Early Painting Life

Beatty was born on May 30, 1869 and went to school in Toronto, Ontario. He was a member of the volunteers who served in the North-West Rebellion in 1885, then worked in the Toronto Fire Department (1869–1900). In his leisure time, he studied art with George Agnew Reid and other teachers. In 1900, he studied at the Académie Julian in Paris with Jean-Paul Laurens and Benjamin Constant. He travelled throughout Europe from 1906 to 1909, painted at the Académie Julian and Académie Colarossi, and travelled to London where he attended the London Chelsea Polytechnic. He made trips to Holland, Belgium and other places to sketch and worked up the sketches when he returned home into many dark, rich, moody paintings of Dutch peasant life and other subjects. From 1912 to 1941, he worked at the Ontario College of Art. Over time, his work changed to more vibrant tones.

Paintings of Algonquin Park were becoming a theme of Canadian painters in the early years of the Twentieth century. In 1909, the year he returned to Canada, he went to the park in order to paint Canadian landscape themes. He painted The Evening Cloud of the Northland in 1910, a view of a forest fire burning in distant hills. Beatty felt that this work represented Canada much better than his previous work called A Dutch Peasant, so he asked the National Gallery if they would exchange the two because, as he explained, "I am a Canadian. I would much rather be represented by a Canadian picture." The Evening Cloud of the Northland is considered a masterpiece and is in the collection of the National Gallery of Canada.

Influences
Beatty shared common interests and feelings with his friends, Lawren Harris, A.Y. Jackson, Tom Thomson, and Arthur Lismer, several of whom later became members of the Group of Seven. In 1917, he worked as an Official War Artist for the Canadian Expeditionary Force but became aghast at the destructive power of modern warfare.

Public Collections 
Art Gallery of Ontario, Toronto
Art Museum at the University of Toronto
Government of Ontario Art Collection, Toronto; 
National Gallery of Canada, Ottawa

Honours 
 Royal Canadian Academy of Arts

See also
 Canadian official war artists
 War artist
 Military art

Notes

Bibliography
 Farr, Dorothy (1981). J.W. Beatty, 1869-1941. Agnes Etherington Art Gallery 
 
 Reid, Dennis R. (1988). A Concise History of Canadian Painting. Toronto: Oxford University Press. ; ;   OCLC 18378555

External links

 More works by Beatty @ ArtNet

1869 births
1941 deaths
Canadian war artists
Académie Julian alumni
19th-century Canadian painters
Canadian male painters
20th-century Canadian painters
19th-century Canadian male artists
20th-century Canadian male artists
Members of the Royal Canadian Academy of Arts
Canadian landscape painters